Hoseynabad (also Romanized as Ḩoseynābād and Hosein Abad; also known as ’oseynābād) is a village in Tang-e Narak Rural District, in the Central District of Khonj County, Fars Province, Iran. At the 2006 census, its population was 464, in 79 families.

References 

Populated places in Khonj County